Choryně is a municipality and village in Vsetín District in the Zlín Region of the Czech Republic. It has about 800 inhabitants.

References

External links

Villages in Vsetín District